Ernest Edward Bankey Jr. (August 28, 1920 – June 10, 2009) was an American World War II flying ace credited with 9.5 aerial victories. He was also an ace in a day, and rose to the rank of colonel in the United States Air Force.

Early life
Bankey was born on August 28, 1920, in Cleveland, Ohio, and was raised in Toledo, Ohio. It was during his youth that he began his interest in planes. He began building model planes from the age of eight. He also won the Soap Box Derby twice, in 1935 and 1936.

Military career
Bankey joined the Army Air Corps at Fort Hayes, Columbus, Ohio, on April 1, 1941.

As a staff sergeant, he taught aerial gunnery techniques in Las Vegas, while awaiting acceptance into Air Cadet School to start pilot training. In July 1943, Bankey gained his commission and pilot wings as part of class 43G at Williams Air Force Base, Arizona. He did his preliminary training in a Stearman PT-13 at Tulare, California, his basic training in a BT-13 Valiant in Modesto, California and advanced training in a T-6 Texan in Phoenix, Arizona.

As a second lieutenant, he joined 383rd Fighter Squadron. His first combat posting was to England with the 364th Fighter Group, 8th Air Force, in February 1944. He was reassigned to the 385th Fighter Squadron.

On December 27, 1944, during the Battle of the Bulge and whilst flying over the Bonn area of Germany, Bankey shot down five enemy planes and shared another. This earned him the designation of "ace in a day". He was also awarded the Distinguished Service Cross and the Distinguished Unit Citation for this sortie. He compiled over 100 sorties and 500 combat hours in two tours of duty. Banks is credited with 9.5 air-to-air kills.

After the war, he returned to the United States, left active duty and joined the Air Force Reserve on April 18, 1946. Bankey was recalled to active duty beginning on March 15, 1953, and then completed Pilot Refresher Training at Graham AB, Florida, followed by Instructor Pilot School at Craig AFB, Alabama.

Bankey served as an instructor pilot and operations officer before serving at the U.S. Air Forces in Europe Weapons Center from July 1957 to September 1958. His next assignment was as a Guided Missile Operations Officer with the 576th Strategic Missile Squadron at Vandenberg AFB, California, from September 1958 to June 1960, followed by service on the staff of Headquarters 1st Missile Division (renamed 1st Strategic Aerospace Division in July 1961) at Vandenberg from June 1960 to April 1963.

His next assignment was as a Missile Test Evaluation Officer with Headquarters Strategic Air Command at Offutt AFB, Nebraska, from April 1963 to November 1966. Col Bankey's final assignment was as Deputy Chief and then Chief of the Evaluation and Capabilities Division with the 3902nd Support Squadron at Offutt AFB from November 1966 until his retirement from the Air Force on March 1, 1968.

Awards and decorations
During his lengthy career, Bankey earned many decorations, including:

  Armed Forces Reserve Medal

  Small Arms Expert Marksmanship Ribbon

  Croix de Guerre with Palm (France)

Bankey was a captain when, on June 26, 1945, he was awarded the Silver Star for actions during World War II. The citation reads:

Final years
After retirement from the Air Force, Bankley joined the Jet Propulsion Laboratories in California. There he worked on deep space projects. He retired in 1975.

Bankey died on June 15, 2009, in his home in Newbury Park, California. He was buried with full military honors in Conejo Mountain Memorial Park in Camarillo, California.

Personal life 
Bankey married Lillian Ruth "Ginny" Kontak on May 2, 1942, in Bowling Green, Ohio. They had four children: sons Dan and Keith, and daughters Sharon and Tina. Bankey has eight grandchildren and seven great-grandchildren. His wife Ginny, died on July 16, 2009; she was in-urned next to her husband.

References

External links
Photograph of Bankey with his North American P-51 Mustang "Lucky Lady VII"

1920 births
2009 deaths
American World War II flying aces
Aviators from Ohio
Military personnel from Cleveland
Recipients of the Silver Star
Recipients of the Distinguished Service Cross (United States)
Recipients of the Distinguished Flying Cross (United States)
Recipients of the Croix de Guerre 1939–1945 (France)
Recipients of the Air Medal
United States Air Force officers
United States Army Air Forces officers
United States Army Air Forces pilots of World War II
People from Newbury Park, California
Military personnel from California